Eqerem Memushi (born 7 May 1965) is an Albanian retired footballer and current manager. During his playing career he was a defender and spent most of his career playing for his hometown club Flamurtari Vlorë and represented as well the Albania national team in years 1990–1991 playing 4 matches.

Playing career

Club
Memushi won a league title with army club Partizani Tirana in 1987, before returning to his hometown club Flamurtari with whom he won another in 1991. He played for Flamurtari in the 1987–88 UEFA Cup against Spanish giants FC Barcelona.

International
He made his debut for Albania in a September 1990 friendly match against Greece and earned a total of 4 caps, scoring no goals. His final international was another friendly against Greece in September 1991.

Managerial career
On 27 January 2017 Memushi was named as the Albania national under-15 football team manager to take vacant place left by departed Alessandro Recenti. Following a 3-months selection in some zones around Albania, on 28 April 2017 an under-15 squad was contoured by Memushi with 20 players which participated in a 5 days gathering between 9–13 May 2017. A week after, Memushi started another gathering in Durrës, Albania between dates 17–19 May 2017 with a squad which contained 21 players. Memushi made his first gathering to play his first match as the under-15 head coach in September 2017 for the double friendly matches against Montenegro U15 on 28 & 30 September 2017. Memushi lost the first match at Reshit Rusi Stadium, Shkodër, Albania 0–4.

Career statistics

International

Honours
Albanian Superliga: 2
 1987, 1991

Albanian Cup: 1
 1988

References

External links
 
 
 Eqerem Memushi Football Player Statistics 11v11.com
 Eqerem Memushi profile at FSHF.org

1965 births
Living people
Footballers from Vlorë
Albanian footballers
Association football defenders
Albania youth international footballers
Albania under-21 international footballers
Albania international footballers
Flamurtari Vlorë players
FK Partizani Tirana players
Kategoria Superiore players
Albanian football managers
Flamurtari Vlorë managers
FK Tomori Berat managers
KF Apolonia Fier managers
Naftëtari Kuçovë managers
KF Bylis Ballsh managers